Hallowes is an English surname deriving from the Old English word halh meaning "hollow". Notable people with this surname include:

 Geoffrey Hallowes (1918–2006), British officer of the Special Operations Executive during World War II 
 Harry Hallowes, Irishman known in the mid 20th century for living on Hampstead Heath
 Ken Hallowes (1913–1995), Anglican bishop in South Africa
 Matthew Hallowes (born 1970), South African field hockey player
 Nathaniel Hallowes (1582–1661), English politician, Parliamentarian during the English Civil War
 Odette Hallowes (1912–1995), Allied intelligence officer during World War II
 Rupert Price Hallowes (1881–1915), British recipient of the Victoria Cross

See also

 
 Hallows (surname)

References